Kenneth Shaun Hickey (born May 22, 1966) is an American heavy metal musician. He was the co-founder, guitarist and backing and occasional co-lead vocalist of the gothic metal band Type O Negative. He is currently the vocalist and guitarist for heavy metal band Silvertomb and was the co-founder of Seventh Void. All three bands also feature fellow Type O Negative member Johnny Kelly on drums. Hickey is also an occasional touring guitarist for Danzig.

Early career
Hickey was born in New York City in 1966. As a youngster he listened to his father's records of Johnny Cash and was diverted into rock and roll after Elton John's album Goodbye Yellow Brick Road. He was asked to join Type O Negative after former Carnivore guitarist Marc Piovanetti declined. Hickey was a childhood friend of the band, growing up in the same neighborhood as the band members. He has been on every Type O Negative release with fellow members Peter Steele and Josh Silver (Johnny Kelly joined in 1994).

Guitars and amplifiers

In the early days of Type O Negative, Hickey could be seen playing a black Gibson Flying V. He played this for the music video of "Christian Woman." He then switched to a black Gibson SG, to which he added green accessories (knobs and pickups and a green painted fretboard), and would continue to follow this trend.  Starting in 1996, he used Fernandes Guitars, starting with a Raven Elite Sustainer and Revolver Sustainer with the green additions like his previous SG. He would use this for over half a decade. He would always use the Raven live, but as seen on the music video for "I Don't Wanna Be Me", he could be seen using a Monterey Deluxe (without EMGs) in satin black, with a green fingerboard.  In 2007, he began using Schecter guitars, most prominently a green C-1 Baritone. Unlike his previous guitars, this has true green inlays, exposed pickups (A Seymour Duncan SH-4 "JB" bridge, and a Sustainiac neck pickup), and the body, including the headstock, the back of the headstock and the back of the neck is entirely green. All Hickey's guitars have invariably been tuned to B Standard throughout his career.

Hickey's early rig (before World Coming Down) consisted of ADA MP-1 & MP-2 preamps or a Marshall JMP-1 with an Alesis Quadraverb running into Marshall 9005 and/or Mosvalve 500 power amps, which were run into one or more Marshall 4x12s w/ G12-75 speakers. During the recording of World Coming Down, Hickey used a Mesa/Boogie dual rectifier, and still uses it, along with a Mesa Boogie Mark IV, as a backup.  His main setup consists of a Mesa Boogie TriAxis preamp and TC Electronics G-Force effects processor being sent to a Mesa Boogie Simul-Class 2: Ninety power amp into one or more Mesa Boogie 4x12 cabinets. In the early days he may have used Dean Markley 10–52 gauged strings for B tuning. Today he uses Ernie Ball Not Even Slinky 12–56.

While performing with Seventh Void, he could be seen using Mesa/Boogie dual rectifiers and Schecter Solo-6 guitars in either a black finish (seen in the music video for "Last Walk In The Light"), or Sunburst (seen in the music video for "Heaven is Gone").

In late 2012, Schecter announced an artist model based on his custom baritone he used near the end of his Type O Negative tenure.

Musical influences
In an interview with Loudwire, Hickey cited the image of Ace Frehley and his signature smoking guitar as one of his motivations to start playing the guitar. He also cited Elton John, Jimi Hendrix, T. Rex, Pink Floyd and Black Sabbath as musical influences.

References

External links
Official Type O Negative website
Seventh Void MySpace profile

1966 births
Living people
American heavy metal guitarists
Danzig (band) members
Type O Negative members
20th-century American guitarists
Kingdom of Sorrow members